The Cycladic Massif is a Miocene high-pressure orogenic segment located in the Aegean Sea underlying the Cyclades.  Initially, the Massif was a single island which began to break apart due to the tectonic activities of the subduction of the African plate under the Eurasian plate during the late Miocene Epoch.

Location

Geology

Volcanos

References

Tectonics
Cyclades
Geography of Greece